Pinne e arpioni is a 1952 Italian documentary film by Folco Quilici.

External links
 

1952 films
1950s Italian-language films
Films directed by Folco Quilici
Italian documentary films
1952 documentary films
1950s Italian films